Makonde, or Kimakonde, is the language spoken by the Makonde, an ethnic group in southeast Tanzania and northern Mozambique. Makonde is a central Bantu language closely related to Yao. The Matambwe (Matembwe) and Mabiha (Maviha) dialects are divergent, and may not be Makonde (Nurse 2003).

A mosquito-borne viral fever first identified on the Makonde Plateau is named 'Chikungunya', which is derived from the Makonde root verb kungunyala (meaning "that which bends up", "to become contorted," or "to walk bent over"). The derivation of the term is generally falsely attributed to Swahili.

Phonology
The following are the consonants and vowels of the Makonde language:

Consonants

Vowels 

There also tends to be a rising final vowel sound /vv́/ within vowel combinations.

References

Rufiji-Ruvuma languages